This is a list of cities and towns in North Macedonia. There are 34 cities and towns in North Macedonia. In Macedonian, every city or town, regardless of size, is called grad (град, pl. gradovi, градови), but a smaller one can also be called gratče (гратче, pl. гратчиња, gratčinja), a diminutive of grad. Only five cities in the country have a population of more than 50,000 inhabitants. The capital, Skopje, is home to about 25% of the country's total population. The 2002 census showed that the majority of the population, 59.5%, lived in urban areas.

The five largest cities in North Macedonia, each with a population of over 50,000 inhabitants, are: Skopje (506,926), Bitola (74,550), Kumanovo (70,842), Prilep (66,246) and Tetovo (52,915).

Seventeen cities in the country have a population between 10,000 and 50,000 inhabitants: Veles (43,716), Štip (43,652), Ohrid (42,033), Gostivar (35,847), Strumica (35,311), Kavadarci (29,188), Kočani (28,330), Kičevo (27,067), Struga (16,559), Radoviš (16,223), Gevgelija (15,685), Debar (14,561), Kriva Palanka (14,558), Sveti Nikole (13,746), Negotino (13,284), Delčevo (11,500) and Vinica (10,863).

Twelve cities have a population of less than 10,000 inhabitants: Resen (8,748), Probištip (8,714), Berovo (7,002), Kratovo (6,924), Bogdanci (6,011), Kruševo (5,330), Makedonska Kamenica (5,147), Valandovo (4,402), Makedonski Brod (3,740), Demir Kapija (3,275), Pehčevo (3,237) and Demir Hisar (2,593).

Statistics

Largest cities
The largest five cities in North Macedonia are:

Smallest towns

The five smallest towns in North Macedonia are:

Demographics

Source: Macedonian census 2002

Settlements by region

Eastern Region

Northeastern Region

Pelagonia Region

Polog Region

Skopje Region

Southeastern Region

Southwestern Region

Vardar Region

References

See also

North Macedonia
List of municipalities in North Macedonia by population
List of twin towns and sister cities in North Macedonia
List of cities in Europe
Europe

North Macedonia
Cities